The American Women's Open was a golf tournament on the LPGA Tour from 1958 to 1961. It was played in the Minneapolis, Minnesota area: at the Brookview Country Club in Golden Valley in 1958 and 1959 and at the Hiawatha Golf Course in Minneapolis in 1960 and 1961.

Winners
1961 Judy Kimball
1960 Patty Berg
1959 Beverly Hanson
1958 Patty Berg

References

Former LPGA Tour events
Golf in Minnesota
Sports in Minneapolis–Saint Paul
Recurring sporting events established in 1958
Recurring sporting events disestablished in 1961
1958 establishments in Minnesota
1961 disestablishments in Minnesota
Women's sports in Minnesota